Alida is a feminine given name. It may also refer to:

Places
 Alida, Indiana, United States, an unincorporated community
Alida, Kansas, United States, a ghost town
 Alida, Minnesota, United States, an unincorporated community
 Alida, Saskatchewan, Canada, a village named for Lady Alida Brittain

Other uses
 Alida (video game), a 2004 adventure game
 , a US Navy tug from 1912 to 1921

See also
 Alide (disambiguation)